Emamdeh (also Romanized as Emāmdeh and Emām Deh; also known as Chāh Qal‘eh, Shāh Kīleh, and Shā Kīleh) is a village in Kuhestan Rural District, in the Central District of Behshahr County, Mazandaran Province, Iran. At the 2006 census, its population was 416, in 102 families.

References 

Populated places in Behshahr County